Music is the eighth studio album by American singer Madonna, released on September 18, 2000, by Maverick and Warner Bros. Records. Following the success of her previous album Ray of Light (1998), she intended to embark on a tour. However, her record company encouraged her to return to the studio and record new music before going on the road. Her collaboration with French producer Mirwais Ahmadzaï resulted in a more experimental direction for the album, with additional production from William Orbit. Music incorporates many different genres into its overall dance-pop and electronica vibe, with influences from funk, house, rock, country and folk. The album was mostly recorded at Sarm West and East Studios in London, England. Elaborating a country theme for the album, Madonna reinvented her image as a cowgirl.

Music received critical acclaim from most critics, who praised Ahmadzaï's unique production. The album earned five Grammy Award nominations, ultimately winning one for Best Recording Package given to art director Kevin Reagan. In 2003, Rolling Stone ranked it at number 452 on their list of The 500 Greatest Albums of All Time. The record was also a commercial success, debuting at number one in over 23 countries across the world and selling four million copies in its first ten days of release. In the United States, Music debuted at number one on the Billboard 200 with first week sales of 420,000 copies, making it her first album to top the chart in more than a decade since Like a Prayer (1989). It was certified triple platinum by the Recording Industry Association of America (RIAA) for three million units shipped in the United States and has sold over 11 million copies worldwide.

The album was promoted with her concerts at Brixton Academy and Roseland Ballroom, as well as several television performances such as the 2000 MTV Europe Music Awards and the 43rd Grammy Awards. It was also supported by the Drowned World Tour, which grossed over US$75 million, making it the highest-grossing tour by a solo act of 2001 (the fourth overall). Three singles were released from the album. The lead single, "Music", topped the record charts in 25 countries worldwide and became Madonna's 12th and most recent number-one hit on the Billboard Hot 100. It was followed with another Hot 100 top-five hit "Don't Tell Me" and "What It Feels Like for a Girl" which attained the top-ten position in several countries worldwide. "Impressive Instant" was released as a promotional single in the United States, peaking at number one on the Hot Dance Club Play chart. “Amazing” was also briefly released as a promotional single in Germany, Spain, Italy and Colombia before being withdrawn shortly afterwards.

Background 
After the critical and commercial success of her album Ray of Light (1998), Madonna intended to embark on a new concert tour in 1999, but due to the delay of her film The Next Best Thing, which she started filming in April 1999, the tour was cancelled. In June 1999, Madonna released a song recorded for the film Austin Powers: The Spy Who Shagged Me, called "Beautiful Stranger". It peaked number nineteen on the Billboard Hot 100 and received a Grammy at the 42nd Grammy Awards for Best Song Written for a Motion Picture, Television or Other Visual Media. In March 2000, Madonna released a cover version of Don McLean's "American Pie" (1971) as part of the soundtrack of the film The Next Best Thing. The song received mixed reviews, and was a success in European charts. Although not released commercially in the United States, it reached number 29 on the Hot 100 chart due to strong radio airplay.

By 2000, she became pregnant with her son Rocco, from her relationship with director Guy Ritchie. Wanting to distract herself from the media frenzy surrounding this news, Madonna concentrated on the development of her eighth studio album, entitled Music. Buoyed by the commercial success of her previous album, she was keen on getting back to the studio to record new music. Madonna was well disposed towards William Orbit, producer of Ray of Light, but by 2000, his production and sound had become ubiquitous. Also, the music scene was being dominated by a younger generation of singers like Britney Spears and Christina Aguilera, prompting Madonna to look for a distinctive sound within this market. She was then introduced to French DJ and producer Mirwais Ahmadzaï. Madonna instantly liked his pitch-shifting, pulverizing rhythms and his utilization of acid bass in his songs. Ahmadzaï always preferred taking musical risks and hence he wanted the collaborations with Madonna to get out the best from the singer. Before the album was released, Madonna recorded a statement to her fans, stating about the album and Ahmadzaï:

"Hey Mr. DJ, put a record on... Hi, it's Madonna. You've probably been hearing about my new record, Music, for a while. Well, I just wanted to make sure you knew that the single is gonna drop very soon. I worked on it with a French guy named Mirwais, and he is the shit. The album will be released worldwide on September 19, and I hope you like my music."

Development 
By September 1999, Madonna had begun working on a new album and had initially approached DJ Sasha to work with her. Together, they began writing new material with what Sasha described as a "progressive house feel." At the same time, Madonna began collaborating again with Orbit, who commented that the material was "quite a little edgier than Ray of Light", elaborating that "It's almost like we started off with a lot of slow ballad songs and she's started to kind of chuck 'em out in favor of more edgy tracks. The album is getting more kind of fast, very European sounding, very English and French sounding, naturally, 'cause everybody working on it apart from her is English or French. Pretty exciting, actually. It's like a follow-up for Ray of Light without stopping still. It's perfect". But after some recording sessions, she felt she needed a different sound for her project and scrapped most of the material.

In October 1999, Madonna began working with Ahmadzaï, who was introduced to Madonna by her manager Guy Oseary. In an interview with CNN, she stated, "Guy Oseary, my partner at Maverick [Records], was given a demo by a French artist called Mirwais. [He] slipped it to me and said, 'What do you think [of him] as an artist to sign at Maverick?' [...] I just said 'Oh my God, this is what I want.' I just flipped over it and said, 'Please find out if he wants to work with me.'" Ahmadzaï spoke little English, and Madonna commented: "The first couple of days we were recording, I wanted to rip my hair out. [...] It didn't seem like there was any way for us to communicate. His manager had to come in and translate everything at first."

She also commented about working with Ahmadzaï and the other producers of the album: "I love to work with the weirdos that no one knows about—the people who have raw talent and who are making music unlike anyone else out there. Music is the future of sound." Madonna had later proclaimed Ahmadzaï to be a musical "genius". In an interview with MTV's Total Request Live, she said Ahmadzaï was "really influenced by 1970s funk and R&B" and said that the album was "more electronic than her last record, but it is edgier and a bit funkier". Talking about the inspiration behind Music, Madonna said the album was "To join the coldness or the remoteness of living in the machine age in the world of high technology with warmth and compassion and a sense of humor. [...] Music is supposed to be a reflection of what's going on in society, and as far as I'm concerned, we've become too complacent." In an interview with The Face, Madonna was questioned about her mood while developing the album. She commented,
"To tell you the truth, I didn't know what the mood was. I feel like an animal that's, like, ready to be sprung from a cage. I've been living a pretty low-key domestic existence and I miss things. Like, I miss performing, and dancing, and being on the road, that kind of energy. So part of the record is about that. And then the other part is about love. So there's the frivolous side of my life and then there's the –hopefully– non-frivolous side of my life. I usually make a record that's one or the other, and I feel I did both on this one".

Music structure and lyrics 

Slant Magazines Sal Cinquemani described the album as having a "more experimental direction". With The Face magazine, Madonna explained her inspirations behind the songs and the music of Music. She said, "This record, more than any other records, covers all the areas of my life. I left off partying on Ray of Light. But I'd just had a baby, so my mood was complete, like wonderment of life, and I was incredibly thoughtful and retrospective and intrigued by the mystical aspects of life." Madonna also summed it up as "Funky, electronic music blended with futuristic folk. Lots of jangly guitars and moody melancholic lines." "Music", the title track is the first featured on the record. Starting with Madonna's androgynous voice saying "Hey Mr. DJ, put a record on, I wanna dance with my baby". Above this lyric, Madonna's voice electronically manipulated asks "Do you like to boogie woogie?". According to Santiago Fouz-Hernández in his book Madonna's Drowned Worlds: New Approaches to Her Cultural Transformations, "Music" is a "disco anthem, and the beat commands [the people] to get up and dance". He also said that the song is an expression to her public and it is one of Madonna's catchiest singles of her career. The second track "Impressive Instant" is a club-savvy stomper marked by futuristic keyboard lines and vocals that darken from distorted, and robotic passages. Madonna claimed that the song was the hardest to write. Madonna sings, "I like to singy, singy, singy, like a bird on a wingy, wingy, wingy", with childlike abandon amid a vibrant, celebratory swirl of electronic keyboard riffs and thumpy dance beats.

The third track, "Runaway Lover", is a trance/house rave track. It is one of Madonna's collaborations with William Orbit for the album. The following track, "I Deserve It", is an acoustic-framed track that is anchored by a hip-hop inflected groove. Madonna said the track "has the strangest juxtaposition of this folky, simple song and this high-tech, ominous synth line." The song lends weight to rich, introspective lyrics, such as the chorus lines: "Many miles, many roads I have traveled, fallen down of the way/Many hearts, many years have unraveled, leading up to today."  "Amazing", the fifth track, is a vibrant tempo-shifter that opens with a soft, music-box-like keyboard/string flourish. The song has been compared by Madonna to "Beautiful Stranger" (1999), saying the reason she fought with her record company to cancel the release as a single was because of the similarity. The sixth track, "Nobody's Perfect", includes ethereal vocals and a dreamy keyboard. The following track and second single, "Don't Tell Me", was written by Joe Henry, Madonna's brother-in-law. He performed and released the track, originally named "Stop", on his 2001 album Scar. His wife Melanie sent a demo of the track to her sister, who liked it and recorded her version. It is framed by soft acoustic guitars and subtle keyboard lines. The eighth track and third single, "What It Feels Like for a Girl", comments on female role-playing in society. The following track, "Paradise (Not for Me)", has lyrics sung in French, and the lyric "I can't remember, when I was young, I can't explain if it was wrong" reflected an artistic palette, "encompassing diverse musical, textual and visual styles in its lyrics." Musically, it draws influence from Édith Piaf. The song was also included on Mirwais Ahmadzaï's album Production (2000). The tenth and final track on the album, "Gone", contrasts acoustic guitars with electronic elements. Soulful vocals give depth to such striking, cautionary lyrics as "Turn to stone, lose my faith, and I'll be gone."

Artwork 

For the album artwork, Madonna wears a blue sequin shirt, embellished jeans, red high heels and a blue cowboy hat. In it, she faces the camera, while in the background a car and a house are seen. In other pictures from the same shoot, Madonna is photographed lying on a bed of hay and wearing a fringed, rhinestone encrusted cowboy shirt, embellished jeans, gold mules and a pink cowboy hat and tiara. The country was a constant theme throughout the design, as the album's title, which was a logo that simulated a buckle, showing the silhouette of a cowboy while riding a horse and a yellow background; the bright colors give a sharp contrast compared to the photograph. Photo sessions were conducted by Jean Baptiste Mondino, who had worked previously with the singer on photoshoots and music videos. According to Fouz-Hernández, the artwork is "a complete celebration to the field" western United States. He also added that it was "distinctly camp", and notably Madonna's "combination of Western clothing with expensive shoes and bright red high heels". He pointed out that there was "a clear evocation of Judy Garland – a major gay icon – in the artwork". The art direction and design for the album were done by Kevin Reagan.

The pictures were shot in Los Angeles, California, in April 2000. In an interview with CNN's Style with Elsa Klensch, Mondino said that he was the one who had the idea of the western themes for the album, and also stated: "[Madonna] wasn't sure at first, but I told her that if she didn't like it I won't charge her. But she loved the final result!". Madonna also decided to use her new country style during her public appearances for Musics promotion; including jeans, shirts and cowboy hats. On her next tour in 2001, Madonna included a segment based entirely on this ambient. Meanwhile, Fouz-Hernández explained that "in this appearance Madonna may be parodying and criticizing Country, which symbolizes among other things, the supremacy of the white man, the ambition of the European pioneers and the American Dream. However, we do not realize that while recognizing the importance that the country has in American popular culture, and joins a long list of artists who have done this previously. Despite this, the cowgirl image of Madonna has become one of her most recognized reinventions.

Release 

On August 22, 2000, a month before the album's official release, all tracks from Music were leaked online through Napster. The album was finally released September 18, 2000 in the United Kingdom, by Maverick Records. It was released worldwide on September 19, 2000, under Maverick, and distributed by Warner Bros. Records. At the same time, it was released as a limited edition which contained a 24-page booklet about the album, a copper brooch with the album's logo and two stickers, wrapped in a linen cloth available in four different colors. The Japanese edition was published on September 15, 2000, and contained two bonus tracks, "American Pie" and "Cyber-raga". Additionally, the European version contained only "American Pie" as a bonus track. It was not added as a bonus track except in the United States and Canada. Madonna commented that "It was something a certain record company executive twisted my arm into doing", and said she regretted putting the song on the album. Also, users who downloaded the album using Apple's QuickTime application had exclusive access to two remixes of "Music". The edition released in Mexico contains as bonus tracks "Lo Que Siente la Mujer", a Spanish version of "What It Feels Like for a Girl" and a remix of the same song by the group Above & Beyond. For the Drowned World Tour, it was released as a special edition with a bonus CD with remixes and the video of "What It Feels Like for a Girl".

Madonna chatted with fans through her first live chat on AOL on the day of Musics release. In order to celebrate the album's release, Madonna had a release party at dance emporium Catch One in Los Angeles, California, on September 20, 2000. The £1.4 million party paid by the singer's record company Warner Bros. and Us magazine was attended by 600 select guests who received special invitations. The party invites were sent out in white leather boxes, lined with black fur. A gold necklace was inside with letters spelling out the album's title, and only those wearing the necklaces would be allowed into the club. More than a dozen strippers were in attendance to keep the party in the same theme as from the music video for "Music". She sported a five-carat diamond ring Ritchie gave her for her birthday, and a black T-shirt that read "Snatch Coming Soon" promoting Ritchie's film, while Ritchie promoted Madonna's album wearing a T-shirt with the word Music emblazoned on it. Among those who attended the party were Sheryl Crow, Gwen Stefani, Maverick Records' head Guy Oseary, and George Clinton, who arrived with Macy Gray in a horse-drawn carriage. Madonna's then-boyfriend Guy Ritchie was initially denied access into the VIP lounge by a security guard. He apparently got into a shoving match with a bodyguard who did not know who he was.

Promotion

Live performances 

Following the album's release and motherhood, Madonna appeared on The Late Show with David Letterman on November 3, 2000, being the first time since her controversial appearance in 1994, and performed "Don't Tell Me". Madonna made a concert on November 5, 2000, at Roseland Ballroom in New York City. Accompanying musicians performing with Madonna were Mirwais Ahmadzaï on guitar and longtime backing singers Niki Haris and Donna De Lory. The costumes for the show and the set was designed by Dolce & Gabbana. Songs performed included "Impressive Instant", "Runaway Lover", "Don't Tell Me", "What It Feels Like for a Girl", and "Music". In the performance of New York, she wore a T-shirt with "Britney Spears" written on it. She then traveled to Europe to further promote the album. The singer performed "Don't Tell Me" on German game-show Wetten, dass..? on November 11, 2000. At the MTV Europe Music Awards 2000, Madonna performed "Music" on November 16, 2000, in Stockholm, Sweden. After being introduced by Ali G as "Maradona", she performed the song wearing a T-shirt with the name of Australian recording artist Kylie Minogue printed on it. She later performed "Don't Tell Me" and "Music" on British television program Top of The Pops, in an appearance aired on November 17.

On November 24, 2000, Madonna performed the latter songs live on French television program Nulle Part Ailleurs. Madonna then played another concert on November 29, 2000, at Brixton Academy in London. It was shown via the internet to an estimated record-breaking 9 million viewers across the world. The setlist was the same from the Roseland Ballroom's concert, with the song "Holiday" being added to the setlist. The singer Richard Ashcroft and the Scottish band Texas opened the concert. Madonna then performed "Don't Tell Me" on Carràmba! Che fortuna in Italy, on December 2, 2000, hosted by Raffaella Carrà. On February 21, 2001, she performed "Music" at the 43rd Grammy Awards. For the performance, the stage had five giant video screens, which showed images from her career. Madonna entered onto the stage in a classic Cadillac driven by rapper Bow Wow. The singer emerged from the back seat of the car in a full-length fur coat and a hat, quickly removing the clothes to reveal a tight leather jacket and jeans. She removed her jacket to reveal a black tank top with the words "Material Girl" printed on it. Host Jon Stewart commented right after, talking about how he was getting older and commenting, "As I was watching Madonna writhing around on the hood of the car, all I could think was — that’s really gonna drive up her insurance premiums".

Tour 

To promote Music and Ray of Light, Madonna embarked on her fifth concert tour, the Drowned World Tour. It started in June 2001 and was Madonna's first tour in eight years since The Girlie Show World Tour (1993). The tour was to be started before the year 2000, but she had become pregnant with her son Rocco Ritchie, released Music that year, and married Guy Ritchie in December 2000. When Madonna finally decided to go on the tour, time was short and she had to prepare the show within three months. Jamie King was signed up as the creative director and the choreographer of the show. The tour was divided into five segments, namely punk, geisha, cowboy, Latin and ghetto. Each segment represented a phase of Madonna's career. Several changes were made to the final shows in Los Angeles after the September 11 attacks: Madonna wore an American flag kilt during the show's opening segment as a display of patriotism, the closing of "Mer Girl" (part II) was altered to remove the staged shooting of a character; Madonna instead put the gun down, hugged him and they left the stage together. The macabre cannibalism-themed "Funny Song" was removed. The tour received positive reviews. The tour was a commercial success, grossing a total of US$75 million, and it was the highest-grossing concert tour of a solo artist in 2001. The tour received the Major Tour of the Year and Most Creative Stage Production awards nominations at the 2001 Pollstar awards, but lost them to U2. The concert was broadcast live on HBO from The Palace of Auburn Hills in Auburn Hills, Michigan  August 26, 2001. The Drowned World Tour 2001 DVD was released in all regions on November 13, 2001.

Singles 
"Music" was released as the lead single from the album on August 21, 2000, by Warner Bros. Records. "Music" has been praised by contemporary critics. Some compared it with Madonna's older songs, like "Into the Groove" (1985) and "Holiday" (1983). "Music" achieved international success by topping the charts in 25 countries worldwide. It became Madonna's 12th number-one single on the US Billboard Hot 100, making Madonna the second artist to achieve number one hits in the 1980s, 1990s, and 2000s on the Hot 100. In the United Kingdom, "Music" peaked at number one on the UK Singles Chart.

"Don't Tell Me" was released on November 21, 2000, as the second single from the album. It reached at number four and spent eight weeks in the top ten of the Billboard Hot 100. The song topped the music charts in the Canada, Italy and New Zealand and attained top-ten positions on the charts of many other European nations. In 2005, the song was placed at number 285 on Blender magazine's The 500 Greatest Songs Since You Were Born.

"What It Feels Like for a Girl" was released as the third and final single from the album, on April 17, 2001. It received positive appreciation from contemporary critics. The song lost the top-twenty on the official chart of the United States, but it was a success on the US dance charts. The music video, directed by Guy Ritchie, portrays Madonna as an angry woman on a crime spree. Reviewers criticized the video for being overly violent and graphic. The video was banned from most North American and European video stations, receiving only early hours play.

"Impressive Instant" was released as a club promo only single with remixes by Peter Rauhofer on September 18, 2001. It went to number one on the Hot Dance Club Play chart where it stayed for two weeks. The song was intended by Madonna to be released as the fourth single off Music but Madonna's recording company wanted "Amazing" to be the next single, which was also released as a promotional single in late 2001, in a few select countries before being withdrawn. Madonna felt that "Amazing" was too similar to her previous single "Beautiful Stranger" (1999), so they were deadlocked. Warner Bros. planned to move forward with the release of "Amazing" without Madonna's help since she was too busy preparing for her next tour, and planned to promote the single with a music video cut from the live version of "Amazing" from Madonna's Drowned World Tour, but she scrapped the song from the set list to be sure that Warner Bros. could not promote it, and the fourth single idea was over.

Critical reception 

Music received generally critical acclaim from music critics. At Metacritic, which assigns a normalized rating out of 100 to reviews from mainstream publications, the album received an average score of 80, based on 16 reviews, indicating "generally favorable reviews." Stephen Thomas Erlewine of AllMusic praised the album's layered music and described Madonna's collaboration with Mirwais as the reason why the album "comes alive with spark and style". Dimitri Ehrlich from Vibe called the album "a masterpiece of brilliantly arranged keyboards, futuristic drums, and electronica dressings. With folky acoustic guitars and a vaguely spiritual bent to her lyrics (like those on Ray of Light), it's a weird and fresh-sounding album." Andrew Lynch of Entertainment.ie, who gave the album three out of five stars, claimed that it contains "brilliant futuristic dance music", yet, claimed that the lyrics were "trite". Robert Christgau from The Village Voice said the record has "consistency and flow" because all of its songs are good and lowbrow: "From Vocoder to cowgirl suit, she's got her sass back." David Browne was less enthusiastic in Entertainment Weekly, calling it "her most patchwork record since the Sean Penn years... In the way it tiptoes around sundry moods and beats, Music is frustratingly inconsistent, as if Madonna herself weren't sure where to venture next. At times, it feels like a collection of sounds -- clever, intriguing ones, to be sure -- that seek to compensate for ordinary melodies and Madonna's stoic delivery."

Spin said that the album "is a much-needed breath of fresh VapoRub." Danny Eccleston, in a review for Q, called it a "brave, radical and punchy (at a refreshing 49 minutes in length) album". A retrospective review in Blender remarked: "Her first 'headphones album'... It's more playful and less pompous than Ray of Light." Rolling Stone stated that the album was a rough and improvised version of Ray of Light, but lauded that Madonna had chosen to make a more "instinctive" record than her previous endeavours. Mojo magazine said that "Music is fitful and its charms aren't all immediate, but Madonna is still doing what she does best--giving a lick of pop genius to the unlikely genre of experimental dance music." NME said that Music is "vocodered, stretched, distorted, warped, deliberately upstaged by beats so showy they belong in a strip joint – quite simply, she's almost managed to make herself disappear. That bluntly explicit title isn't just pointless irony. This record is about the music, not Madonna; about the sounds, not the image." Slant Magazine criticised Madonna's collaborations with William Orbit, who had worked with her on Ray of Light, calling them repetitive and uninteresting despite being catchy. In 2015, Rob Sheffield of Rolling Stone said that Music is "still [Madonna's] hardest-rocking and most seductive album."

Accolades 
The album earned Madonna a total of five Grammy Award nominations. In 2001, it won Best Recording Package and was nominated for Best Pop Vocal Album, while the title track was nominated for Record of the Year and Best Female Pop Vocal Performance. In 2002, Madonna received one more nomination for "Don't Tell Me" in the Best Short Form Music Video category. 

Music was voted the 16th best record of 2001 in the Pazz & Jop, and was placed at 18th in Dean's List, both annual polls published by The Village Voice. Spin Magazine named "Music" the 18th best album of 2000. On NMEs list of the 50 best albums of 2000, Music was ranked at number 47. Three editors of Billboard also chosen Music in their top five of best-of albums of 2000. Music also featured in a number of the best albums of the decade; Slant Magazine included the album on their list of "The Best Albums of the Aughts" at number 31, while it was included at WFPK's 500 Albums of the 2000's at number 223. In 2003, the album was listed at number 452 on Rolling Stones The 500 Greatest Albums of All Time. It is Madonna's fourth album on the list, then the most among female artists. Music also featured in the book 1001 Albums You Must Hear Before You Die.

Commercial performance 
Ten days after the album's release, CNN reported that it had sold over four million copies worldwide. The album set a record in Warner Music Group as the biggest album shipment in the company, with three million copies worldwide in the first-week. Music debuted at number-one in 23 countries. Overall, Music was the 19th best-selling album of 2001 worldwide, selling 4.1 million copies. As of 2010, it has sold more than 11 million copies around the world, and is one of the best-selling albums by women.

It debuted at the top of the US Billboard 200 with over 420,000 copies sold and became the first Madonna album to reach the top of the charts in eleven years in the region, since Like a Prayer (1989). The album was certified three times platinum by the Recording Industry Association of America (RIAA) on November 21, 2005. As of August 2016, Music has sold 2,934,000 copies there according to Nielsen SoundScan. It sold additional 97,000 units at the BMG Music Club, which are not counted by the Nielsen SoundScan. In Canada, the album debuted at the top of the Canadian RPM Albums Chart with first week sales of 50,300 copies and was certified platinum by the Canadian Recording Industry Association (CRIA) for shipments of 300,000 copies. The album experienced success in Latin America, obtaining certifications in Argentina (2× Platinum), Brazil (Gold), Chile (Gold) and Mexico (Gold).

Throughout Europe, the album also did well on its charts topping the European Albums Charts and selling two million in the first-ten days, for which she broke records according Paul Sexton from Billboard. It ended as one of the highest certified albums in Europe by the International Federation of the Phonographic Industry (IFPI) with five times platinum, equivalent of five million copies. Music debuted at number one on the UK Albums Chart with 152,000 copies. The album was certified five times platinum by the British Phonographic Industry. As of January 2020, the album has sold 1,640,000 copies in the UK. On October 1, 2000, Music debuted at number one on the Austrian Albums Chart, spending a total of forty weeks in the chart. The album achieved relatively good charting in both the Flemish and Wallonian territories in Belgium, peaking at numbers two respectively. Music was fifth best selling album in Denmark with 66,996 copies sold in 2000. On the French Albums Chart, the album debuted at number one, staying 67 weeks on the chart, before falling out on June 29, 2002. The album was certified twice platinum by the Syndicat National de l'Édition Phonographique (SNEP).  On September 28, 2000, Music debuted at number one on the Swedish Singles Chart, before falling out at number 52. Similarly in Switzerland, the album also peaked at number one, and spent 42 weeks fluctuating inside the chart. The album managed to sell 50,000 units in Poland in its first five days and was later certified with a platinum award from ZPAV for sales of 100,000 units. Music ended as the best-selling foreign album of 2000 in Poland.

The album enjoyed success in Asia-Pacific countries. In Australia, Music peaked at number two on the ARIA Albums Chart failing to reach the top spot due to the success of The Games of the XXVII Olympiad: Official Music from the Opening Ceremony. The album was certified three times platinum by the Australian Recording Industry Association (ARIA), and was highlighted by ARIA as one of the biggest releases in their year-end report of 2000. In New Zealand, Music debuted and peaked at number two on October 8, 2000, staying on the chart for thirty-three weeks. The album debuted at number seven on the Oricon weekly album chart in Japan. The album was awarded at the Hong Kong Record Sales Award 2001 by the IFPI Hong Kong for becoming one of ten biggest-selling international album of the year.

Legacy 

Tom Breihan of Stereogum, wrote that Music anticipated "a lot of things", while Madonna didn't invent any of these things, most of them had been just about "absent from mainstream pop music around the turn of the millennium". In his review, he added examples such as "thudding big-room" electro-house, "aggressive" vocal manipulation, "ecstatic" lyrical meaninglessness, acoustic guitars chopped up and refracted into unrecognizable shapes, joyous hedonism, robot voices and the half-ironic embrace of cowboy kitsch. Writing for the Grammy Awards, Zel McCarthy called this Madonna era as "a reminder of a less complicated time and a blueprint for our future", noting that Madonna could be analog and digital, acoustic or electronic. He particularly praised "Impressive Instant", describing it like "nothing anyone had heard before—20 years later, it still does."

Joe Lynch from Billboard in the 20th anniversary of Music, called it "a key piece of 21st century dancefloor canon". The album was conceived in the time that America was divided, by music genres and also presented an ageing Madonna in an era dominated by newer artists focused in teen-pop and urban-style oriented music. Lynch praised the fact that the dance-pop was hardly dominant genre in the United States dawn of the new millennium against teen-pop or hip-hop-flavored R&B styles. McCarthy noticed that Madonna "deftly eschewed the petty cultural battles between genres and generations", and she was seen wearing T-shirts emblazoned with the names of Britney Spears and Kylie Minogue, saying that was her "celebration of other girls in pop music". The author said that "such spontaneous statements of support and admiration are almost boringly common now, but in an era when pop music had been denied entry into the credibility club, the moment held more weight. The Straits Times also noted the year dominated by boybands and pop teen artists, while Madonna ushered 1980s-electro as "a new retro-fad".

Silvio Pietroluongo of Billboard called "a move that could be considered either unusual or genius" about the decision of release various formats for its led single "Music" (maxi-CD and vinyl one week, cassette and CD the next). It was described as a "phenomenal week at retail" and that helped push "Music" to the number one at the Billboard Hot 100, giving Madonna her best one-week sales total of the Nielsen SoundScan era for a single at that time with 62,000 units, as Pietroluongo also said: "I'm finding it quite difficult to think of another maxi-CD that has scanned that many units in a week".

Track listing 
All tracks produced by Madonna and Mirwais Ahmadzaï, except where noted.

Notes
David Torn was not credited on the original liner notes of Music. Madonna added him as a co-writer of "What It Feels Like for a Girl" after she found out Sigsworth had sampled from Torn's 1987 album, Cloud About Mercury, without her knowledge.
"What It Feels Like for a Girl" contained a spoken word sample by actress Charlotte Gainsbourg from the 1993 British film The Cement Garden.

Personnel 
Credits adapted from the album's liner notes.

Musicians 

 Madonna – vocals, guitar
 Steve Sidelnyk – drums
 Guy Sigsworth – guitar, keyboard, programming
 William Orbit – keyboard, guitar, programming, backing vocals
 Mirwais Ahmadzaï – guitar, keyboard, programming
 Sean Spuehler – programming
 Michel Colombier – string arrangement

Technical 

 Madonna – production
 William Orbit – production 
 Guy Sigsworth – production 
 Mirwais Ahmadzaï – production 
 Mark "Spike" Stent – production ; mixing
 Jake Davies – engineering
 Mark Endert – engineering
 Geoff Foster – engineering, string engineer
 Sean Spuehler – engineering
 Tim Lambert – engineering assistance
 Chris Ribando – engineering assistance
 Dan Vickers – engineering assistance
 Tim Young – mastering

Artwork 

 Kevin Reagan – art direction, design
 Matthew Lindauer – design
 Jean-Baptiste Mondino – photography

Charts

Weekly charts

Year-end charts

Decade-end charts

All-time charts

Certifications and sales

See also 
List of best-selling albums by women
List of best-selling albums in Europe
List of UK Albums Chart number ones of the 2000s
List of number-one albums of 2000 (Canada)
List of number-one hits of 2000 (France)
List of number-one hits of 2000 (Germany)
List of number-one hits of 2000 (Italy)
List of number-one albums of 2000 (Poland)
List of number-one albums of 2000 (U.S.)

Notes

References

External links 
 
 
 Library + Archives: Music at the Rock and Roll Hall of Fame

2000 albums
Albums produced by Madonna
Albums produced by William Orbit
Albums produced by Guy Sigsworth
Madonna albums
Maverick Records albums
Electronica albums by American artists